The Quest is a graphic fantasy text adventure released in 1983 by Penguin Software. It was designed by Dallas Snell for the Apple II and was later ported to the Atari 8-bit family, Commodore 64, DOS, and Macintosh.

Plot
The game takes place in a medieval fantasy setting in the Kingdom of Balema as a dragon threatens its citizens. The player takes the role of the King's newest adviser and with the help of the King's champion, Gorn, set out to end the dragon menace.

Gameplay

The player controls the actions of the party by typing basic commands that are to be issued by the player's character and performed by either the group, Gorn, or your character. The game is played largely by nonlinear exploration and finding important items to allow the player to complete the objective. The player has access to both a text and graphic description of each scene and is able to toggle between strictly text and text/graphic mode.

Development
When the game was brought to Penguin Software, some of its content was deemed slightly too mature for publication and was subsequently "toned down" for its release.

Reception
The game was given a review in Playboy and is the only game published by Penguin Software to be reviewed by the magazine. Electronic Fun with Computers & Games called it "one of the best combinations of graphics and text around".  While praising the graphics, SoftSide described the game's multiple ways to win as a "unique aspect".  Softline wrote, "It looks like Penguin Software has really done it: adventure game with beautiful hi-res graphics, a great plot, and sneaky surprises!"

References

External links
 The Quest @ Legends World 
 Images of The Quest package and manual
 

1980s interactive fiction
1983 video games
Apple II games
Atari 8-bit family games
Classic Mac OS games
Commodore 64 games
DOS games
Video games developed in the United States
Penguin Software games
Single-player video games